The 108th Virginia General Assembly was the meeting of the legislative branch of the Virginia state government from 1914 to 1916, after the 1913 state elections. It convened in Richmond for two sessions.

Background

Party summary
Resignations and new members are discussed in the "Changes in membership" section, below.

Senate

Senate

Leadership

Members

Changes in membership

Senate
April 8, 1914, John M. Hart (D-4th district) resigns to accept appointment as Collector of Internal Revenue for the Western District of Virginia. Replaced by William L. Andrews at start of extra session.
April 13, 1914, Richard C. L. Moncure (D-13th district) resigns to accept appointment as Collector of Internal Revenue for the Eastern District of Virginia. Replaced by C. O'Conor Goolrick at start of extra session.
June 25, 1914, Samuel T. Montague (D-33rd district) resigned to become postmaster of Portsmouth. Replaced by William C. Corbitt at start of extra session.
December 19, 1914, Edward Echols (D-9th district) dies. Replaced by William H. Landes at start of extra session.

House of Delegates

Leadership

See also
 List of Virginia state legislatures

References

Government of Virginia
Virginia legislative sessions
1914 in Virginia
1915 in Virginia
1914 U.S. legislative sessions
1915 U.S. legislative sessions